Football Center Kovel-Volyn Kovel is a Ukrainian football team based in Kovel, Ukraine. The club used to play in the Ukrainian Second Division and also served as a reserve team for the FC Volyn Lutsk franchise.

The club was established in 1986 as Silmash Kovel.

The club fields senior, junior and female teams.

Honours
 Football Federation of Volyn
 Winners (8): 1995, 2003, 2004, 2005, 2008, 2009, 2010, 2013
 Runner-up (1): 2011

 Volyn Cup
 Winners (2): 2011, 2018

External links
 Kovel-Volyn (Ковель-Волинь (Волинська обл.)). AAFU.

 
Amateur football clubs in Ukraine
Football clubs in Volyn Oblast
FC Volyn Lutsk
Ukrainian reserve football teams
1986 establishments in Ukraine